The Fifth Tunisia Plan was an economic development plan implemented by the government of Tunisia from 1977 to 1981.

The government allocated 47% of its investment to capital-intensive projects.

See also
 Economy of Tunisia
 Third Tunisia Plan
 Fourth Tunisia Plan
 Sixth Tunisia Plan
 Seventh Tunisia Plan
 Ninth Tunisia Plan

References

Economic history of Tunisia